Marina Laurencon (born 10 September 1960 in Briançon) is a French former alpine skier who competed in the 1980 Winter Olympics.

External links
 sports-reference.com
 

1960 births
Living people
French female alpine skiers
Olympic alpine skiers of France
Alpine skiers at the 1980 Winter Olympics
People from Briançon
Sportspeople from Hautes-Alpes
20th-century French women